A Physical Society is a  professional organization or learned society of physicists, and may refer to:

American Physical Society
Austrian Physical Society
Belgian Physical Society
Brazilian Physical Society
Chinese Physical Society
Danish Physical Society
Deutsche Physikalische Gesellschaft (German Physical Society)
Estonian Physical Society
European Physical Society
French Physical Society
Indian Physical Society
Italian Physical Society
Korean Physical Society
Nepal Physical Society
Netherlands' Physical Society
Polish Physical Society
Spanish Royal Physical Society
Swiss Physical Society
Physical Society of Edinburgh
Physical Society of Iran
Physical Society of Japan
Physical Society of London (now Institute of Physics)

See also
Medical Society (disambiguation)
Bar association
List of mathematical societies